Mboungou Mbadouma is a town in Gabon.  It is located near the confluence between the Ogooue and the Leconi Rivers.

Transport 

It lies near the Trans-Gabon Railway.

References 

 FallinRain Map - elevation = 284m

Populated places in Ngounié Province